The South Florida Bulls lacrosse team will represent the University of South Florida in the sport of women's lacrosse beginning in spring 2025. It will be one of two sports beginning their first season at USF in spring 2025, along with beach volleyball. They will compete in the American Athletic Conference of NCAA Division I. The Bulls will play their home games at Corbett Stadium on USF's Tampa campus, which they will share with the USF men's and women's soccer teams. It is the university's newest varsity sports team and the first new USF team since football was established in 1997. It will be the first new women's team in an NCAA sport at USF since women's soccer in 1995 (USF's women's sailing team was established in 1997, but it competes in the Inter-Collegiate Sailing Association rather than the NCAA).

The team will be coached by Mindy McCord.

History 
The USF women's lacrosse team was first announced in November 2021 and will become the university's 20th varsity sports team. They were originally scheduled to take the field for the first time in spring 2024, but this date was later pushed back to spring 2025. Their first home field will be the on-campus Corbett Stadium which was built in 2011 as the new home for the Bulls soccer teams. This will be a temporary arrangement until plans are made for a lacrosse-specific stadium some time in the future.

In May 2022, athletic director Michael Kelly announced that former Jacksonville Dolphins head coach Mindy McCord would be the first head coach of the program.

See also 
South Florida Bulls

References

External links 
Team website
South Florida Bulls
2021 establishments in Florida
Lacrosse clubs established in 2021
College women's lacrosse teams in the United States
Lacrosse teams in Florida